Appling County is a county located in the southeastern part of the U.S. state of Georgia. As of the 2020 census, the population was 18,444. The county seat is Baxley.

History
Appling County is named for Lieutenant Colonel Daniel Appling, a soldier in the War of 1812. Appling County, the 42nd county created in Georgia, was established by an act of the Georgia General Assembly on December 15, 1818. The original county consisted of Creek lands ceded in the 1814 Treaty of Fort Jackson and the 1818 Treaty of the Creek Agency.

On December 15, 1824, Ware County was formed by the Georgia General Assembly from roughly the southern half of Appling land districts 4, 5, and 6, and all of land districts 7, 8, 9, 10, 11, 12, and 13. On December 24, 1825, Appling County land district 6 was added to Telfair County by an act of the Georgia General Assembly. This created an ambiguity of the border between Telfair County and Ware County that was later solved by additional legislation.

On December 8, 1828, Holmesville, Georgia was declared the county seat by the General Assembly. Previously, court was held at residence of William Carter Jr. In 1836, the General Assembly appointed a seven-member commission to find a location for a more centrally located county seat than Holmesville, but were not able to come to a conclusion. The need for a more central county seat would remain a point of contention in county politics for several decades.

On December 18, 1857, the part of Appling County that was south of Lightsey's Ford on Big Creek downstream to the Little Satilla River was taken from Appling County for the creation  of Pierce County.

At the time of the 1850 United States Census, Appling County had a white population of 2,520, a slave population of 404, and 25 free people of color. By the 1860 United States Census, the county had a white population of 3,442, a slave population of 740, and 3 free people of color.

On August 27, 1872, eastern sections of Appling land districts 3 and 4 were added to Wayne County. This area included Wayne County's current county seat Jesup, Georgia, which became the new county seat of Wayne County in 1873. Also in August 1872, the General Assembly called for an election in Appling County to vote on the removal of the county seat to a point along the Macon and Brunswick Railroad. The residents voted for removal and the town of Baxley, Georgia was selected as the new county seat after the election. In February 1873, the General Assembly mistakenly passed a law giving county commissioners to sell the public lands in Holmesville so that the proceeds can go to the construction of a new courthouse in Holmesville. It amended the law a year later for the new courthouse location to read Baxley, as had originally been intended.

On August 18, 1905, Jeff Davis County was created from western portions of Appling County and eastern portions Coffee County. On July 27, 1914, Bacon County was created from parts of Appling County, Pierce County, and Ware County. The remaining section of Appling County that had been located south of Little Satilla River became part of Bacon County.

Geography

The southern two-thirds of Appling County, south of a line from Graham to Baxley, then running due east from Baxley, is located in the Little Satilla River sub-basin of the St. Marys River-Satilla River basin. The northern third of the county is located in the Altamaha River sub-basin of the basin by the same name.

Major highways

  U.S. Route 1
  U.S. Route 23
  U.S. Route 341
  State Route 4
  State Route 15
  State Route 19
  State Route 27
  State Route 121
  State Route 144
  State Route 169
  State Route 203

Adjacent counties
 Toombs County - north
 Tattnall County - northeast
 Wayne County - southeast
 Pierce County - south
 Jeff Davis County - west
 Bacon County - west

Demographics

2000 census
As of the census of 2000, there were 17,419 people, 6,606 households, and 4,855 families living in the county.  The population density was 34 people per square mile (13/km2).  There were 7,854 housing units at an average density of 15 per square mile (6/km2).  The racial makeup of the county was 76.79% White, 19.59% Black or African American, 0.21% Native American, 0.30% Asian, 0.01% Pacific Islander, 2.49% from other races, and 0.61% from two or more races.  4.55% of the population were Hispanic or Latino of any race.

There were 6,606 households, out of which 34.50% had children under the age of 18 living with them, 56.60% were married couples living together, 12.50% had a female householder with no husband present, and 26.50% were non-families. 23.20% of all households were made up of individuals, and 9.80% had someone living alone who was 65 years of age or older.  The average household size was 2.60 and the average family size was 3.04.

In the county, the population was spread out, with 27.10% under the age of 18, 9.00% from 18 to 24, 28.50% from 25 to 44, 23.50% from 45 to 64, and 11.80% who were 65 years of age or older.  The median age was 35 years. For every 100 females there were 97.10 males.  For every 100 females age 18 and over, there were 93.30 males.

The median income for a household in the county was $30,266, and the median income for a family was $34,890. Males had a median income of $27,753 versus $18,148 for females. The per capita income for the county was $15,044.  About 14.90% of families and 18.60% of the population were below the poverty line, including 23.90% of those under age 18 and 24.40% of those age 65 or over.

2010 census
As of the 2010 United States Census, there were 18,236 people, 6,969 households, and 4,894 families living in the county. The racial makeup of the county was 73.4% white, 18.6% black or African American, 0.7% Asian, 0.4% American Indian, 0.1% Pacific islander, 5.7% from other races, and 1.1% from two or more races. Those of Hispanic or Latino origin made up 9.3% of the population. In terms of ancestry, 15.2% were American, 9.3% were Irish, and 8.7% were English.

Of the 6,969 households, 35.0% had children under the age of 18 living with them, 51.9% were married couples living together, 12.6% had a female householder with no husband present, 29.8% were non-families, and 26.3% of all households were made up of individuals. The average household size was 2.56 and the average family size was 3.07. The median age was 38.1 years.

The median income for a household in the county was $36,155 and the median income for a family was $46,005. Males had a median income of $34,757 versus $23,829 for females. The per capita income for the county was $18,977. About 16.6% of families and 22.2% of the population were below the poverty line, including 39.0% of those under age 18 and 13.0% of those age 65 or over.

2020 census

As of the 2020 United States census, there were 18,444 people, 6,656 households, and 4,875 families residing in the county.

Education

Communities

Cities
 Baxley
 Graham

Town
 Surrency

Politics

See also

 National Register of Historic Places listings in Appling County, Georgia
List of counties in Georgia

References

External links
 GeorgiaInfo.com Appling County Courthouse info
 Appling County historical marker

 
1818 establishments in Georgia (U.S. state)
Populated places established in 1818
Georgia (U.S. state) counties